Muckle Flugga is a small rocky island north of Unst in the Shetland Islands, Scotland. It is often described as the northernmost point of the British Isles, but the smaller islet of Out Stack is actually further north. It used to be the northernmost inhabited island, but forfeited that accolade to Unst when Muckle Flugga Lighthouse was automated in 1995 and the last residents moved out.

The name comes from Old Norse, meaning "large steep-sided island". It has frequently been noted on lists of unusual place names.

According to local folklore, Muckle Flugga and nearby Out Stack were formed when two giants, Herman and Saxa, fell in love with the same mermaid. They fought over her by throwing large rocks at each other, one of which became Muckle Flugga. To get rid of them, the mermaid offered to marry whichever one would follow her to the North Pole. They both followed her and drowned, as neither could swim.

References

External links

Uninhabited islands of Shetland